Devin Smith may refer to:

Devin Smith (basketball) (born 1983), American basketball player
Devin Smith (American football) (born 1992), American football wide receiver
Devin Smith (Musician) (born 2001), American Musician

See also
De'Veon Smith (born 1994), American football player
Devon Smith (born 1981), Grenadian cricketer
Devon Smith (footballer) (born 1993), Australian rules footballer